This article contains information about the literary events and publications of 1797.

Events
June 5 – Poet Samuel Taylor Coleridge, living at Nether Stowey in the Quantock Hills, Somerset, renews his friendship with William Wordsworth and Wordsworth's sister, Dorothy, who take a house nearby.
July 15 – George Colman's comedy The Heir at Law opens in London. It introduces the character of Dr. Pangloss to the stage and the phrase "Queen Anne's dead" to the language.
August – The British Home Office sends an agent to Nether Stowey to investigate Coleridge and Wordsworth who are suspected of being French spies.
October – Coleridge composes the poem Kubla Khan in an opium-induced dream, writing down only a fragment of it on waking.
November 1 – Jane Austen's father writes to London bookseller Thomas Cadell to ask if he is interested in seeing the manuscript of Jane's recently completed novel First Impressions (later re-titled Pride and Prejudice); Cadell declines.
November – Wordsworth suggests to Coleridge the theme of The Rime of the Ancient Mariner on a walk in the Quantocks.
December 24 – Walter Scott marries Charlotte Carpenter at St Mary's Church, Carlisle. The couple immediately move to a new home at 50 George Street, Edinburgh.
Hatchards bookshop is founded in London's Piccadilly by John Hatchard; it continues to trade on the same site into the 21st century.

New books

Fiction
"Mrs Carver" (perhaps Anthony Carlisle) – The Horrors of Oakendale Abbey
Hannah Webster Foster (anonymously) – The Coquette, or the History of Eliza Wharton
Friedrich Hölderlin – Hyperion, volume 1
Frances Margaretta Jacson (anonymously) – Disobedience
Jan Potocki – The Manuscript Found in Saragossa
Ann Radcliffe – The Italian, or the Confessional of the Black Penitents
Marquis de Sade – L'Histoire de Juliette
Royall Tyler – The Algerine Captive

Children
Charlotte Palmer – A Newly-Invented Copybook

Drama
Samuel Taylor Coleridge – Osorio
George Colman – The Heir at Law
Richard Cumberland
False Impressions
The Last of the Family
Thomas John Dibdin – Sadak and Kalasrade
Elizabeth Inchbald – Wives as They Were, and Maids as They Are
Robert Jephson – Julia 
Matthew Lewis – The Minister: A Tragedy, in five acts
 Thomas Morton – A Cure for the Heart Ache

Poetry

Non-fiction
Thomas Bewick – History of British Birds vol. 1
François-René de Chateaubriand – Essai sur les révolutions
The Columbian Orator
Johann Gottlieb Fichte – Foundations of Natural Right
Lorenzo Mascheroni – Geometria del Compasso
Thomas Paine – Agrarian Justice
Friedrich Wilhelm Joseph Schelling – Die Weltseele (Soul of the World)

Births
January 10 - Maria da Felicidade do Couto Browne, early Portuguese woman poet (died 1861)
January 28 – Félix Tanco, Colombian-born Cuban poet, and novelist (died 1871)
March 3 – Emily Eden, English poet and novelist (died 1869)
March 13 – Charles de Rémusat, French politician and writer (died 1875)
March 27 – Alfred de Vigny, French poet (died 1863)
April 12 – Ernst August Hagen, Prussian art writer and novelist (died 1880)
June 14 – Jules Lefèvre-Deumier, French author and poet (died 1857)
July 12 – Adele Schopenhauer, German novelist and paper-cut artist (died 1849) 
August 30 – Mary Shelley, English novelist (died 1851)
September 2 – William Stephenson, English Geordie printer, publisher, auctioneer, poet and songwriter (died 1838)
September 16 – Anthony Panizzi, Italian-born English scholar and librarian (died 1879)
September 28 – Sophie von Knorring (Sophie Margareta Zelow), Swedish novelist (died 1848)
October 31 – Jacob Bailey Moore, American journalist and historical writer (died 1853)
November 17 – Saint-Amand, French playwright (died 1885)
December 13 – Heinrich Heine, German poet (died 1856)
December 31 – North Ludlow Beamish, Irish military writer and antiquary (died 1872)
Unknown date – Charlotte Barton, Australian children's author (died 1867)
Approximate date – Thomas Cautley Newby, English publisher (died 1882)

Deaths
March 2 – Horace Walpole, novelist and antiquarian (born 1717)
April 7 – William Mason, English poet and editor (born 1724)
May 27 – François-Noël Babeuf, French journalist and political agitator (executed, born 1760)
July 9 – Edmund Burke, Irish-born philosopher (born 1729)
September 10 – Mary Wollstonecraft, English philosopher (born 1759)
October 4 – Johann Christian Georg Bodenschatz, German Protestant theologian (born 1717)
December – Mathurin-Léonard Duphot, French poet (shot dead, born 1769)
Unknown date – Yuan Mei (袁枚), Chinese poet, diarist and gastronome (born 1716)

References

 
Years of the 18th century in literature